Grasswoods 192J is an Indian reserve of the English River First Nation in Saskatchewan.

References

Indian reserves in Saskatchewan